This is a list of television programs broadcast by Playhouse Disney in the United States and Canada, now known as Disney Junior.

Final programming

Original programming

Acquired programming

Interstitial programming

Former programming

Original programming

Acquired programming

Interstitial programming 

 Circle Time (April 6, 1997 – September 29, 2002)
 Curious George (April 6, 1997 – 1999)
 Will Quack Quack (April 6, 1997 – 1999)
 The Adventures of Spot (April 6, 1997 – September 29, 2002)
 Joke Time (April 6, 1997 – September 29, 2002)
 Behind the Ears (1997–2000, 2007–2009)
 Microscopic Milton (1997 – September 29, 2002)
 Frankenguy & The Professor (November 1997 – September 29, 2002)
 Magic Drawings (1998 – April 15, 2001)
 Feet Beat (1998 – October 6, 2002)
 Pablo the Little Red Fox (1999 – September 29, 2002)
 Animal Stories (1999 – September 29, 2002)
 Poky and Friends (1999 – April 15, 2001)
 Mini Movies (April 16, 2001 – September 29, 2002)
 Stanley's Animal Facts (2001–2006)
 Wiggles Time (January 28, 2002 – March 29, 2007)
 Mike's Super Short Show (January 1, 2002 – 2007)
 BB's Music Time (September 30, 2002 – 2007)
 Good Manners with Max Time (September 30, 2002 – 2007)
 Mickey's Letter Time (September 30, 2002 – 2006)
 Page's Word of the Day (September 30, 2002 – 2007)
 Sharing Time (September 30, 2002 – 2005)
 Use Your Noodle Time (September 30, 2002 – 2005)
 Who, What & Where with Bear Time (September 30, 2002 – 2004)
 Mini Show-and-Tell Time (2003–2007)
 Higglytown Heroes (2003)
 Marcel's Animal Friends (2003)
 Project Playtime (2003–2007)
 Adventures in Nutrition with Captain Carlos (2004–2007)
 Felix and the Flying Machine (2004–2007)
 Here Come the ABCs (January 1, 2005 – 2006)
 Breakfast with Bear (June 20, 2005 – September 15, 2006)
 This is Daniel Cook (July 11, 2005 – January 2, 2009)
 Johnny and the Sprites (October 9, 2005 – January 13, 2007)
 Feeling Good with JoJo (February 20, 2006 – 2008)
 Dan Zanes House Party (June 5, 2006 – December 19, 2008)
 Here Come the 123s (2007)
 This is Emily Yeung (February 20, 2007 – January 4, 2009)

Programming blocks

Final 
 Movie Time Monday (2005–2010); movies aired:
 A Bug's Life
 Aladdin
 Aladdin and the King of Thieves
 Alice in Wonderland
 The Aristocats
 Beauty and the Beast: The Enchanted Christmas
 The Care Bears' Big Wish Movie
 Care Bears: Journey to Joke-a-lot
 Chicken Little
 Cinderella II: Dreams Come True
 Cinderella III: A Twist in Time
 Finding Nemo
 Hercules
 Lady and the Tramp II: Scamp's Adventure
 Lilo & Stitch
 The Many Adventures of Winnie the Pooh
 Mickey, Donald, Goofy: The Three Musketeers
 Mickey's Once Upon a Christmas
 Mickey's Twice Upon a Christmas
 Monsters, Inc.
 Mulan
 Mulan II
 My Little Pony: A Very Minty Christmas
 Oliver & Company
 Our Huge Adventure
 Piglet's Big Movie
 Pocahontas
 Pocahontas II: Journey to a New World
 Pooh's Grand Adventure: The Search for Christopher Robin
 Pooh's Heffalump Movie
 Pooh's Heffalump Halloween Movie
 Robin Hood
 Rolie Polie Olie: The Great Defender of Fun
 Rolie Polie Olie: The Baby Bot Chase
 Racing to the Rainbow
 Santa's Rockin'!
 Spookley the Square Pumpkin
 Springtime with Roo
 Stanley's Dinosaur Round-Up
 Stanley's Great Big Book of Adventure
 Tarzan
 Tarzan II
 The Emperor's New Groove
 The Jungle Book 2
 The Lion King II: Simba's Pride
 The Little Mermaid: Ariel's Beginning
 The Tigger Movie
 Toy Story
 Toy Story 2

Former 
 Super Duper Playhouse Disney Special Event (2002–2005)

See also 
 List of programs broadcast by Disney Junior

Notes

References 

Disney Junior original programming
Disney Channel original programming
Playhouse Disney
Disney Channel related-lists